The Sunny Side is a collection of short stories and essays by A. A. Milne. Though Milne is best known for his classic children's books, he also wrote extensively for adults, most notably in Punch, to which he was a contributor and later assistant editor. The Sunny Side collects his columns for Punch, which include poems, essays and short stories, from 1912 to 1920.

External links 

 Extract from The Sunny Side in The Guardian
 The full text of The Sunny Side at Project Gutenberg
 

Essay collections
British short story collections
British poetry collections
Short story collections by A. A. Milne
1921 short story collections
Methuen Publishing books
British anthologies